The IWI Masada ("fortress") is a semi-automatic, striker-fired and recoil-operated pistol developed and produced by Israel Weapon Industries in 2017. It designed to suit military, law enforcement and civilian needs. It comes with four colors (sniper gray, OD green, black and flat dark earth). US market currently only has black, OD green, and flat dark earth.

Users 

 : Philippine National Police

 : MARCOS

References 

Semi-automatic pistols of Israel
9mm Parabellum semi-automatic pistols